Goleszów is one of two railway stations in Goleszów, Poland, the other is Goleszów Górny railway station. The station is located at the junction of the railway lines 190 and 191 near the village of Kozakowice Górne.

References

Railway stations in Poland opened in 1888
Railway stations in Silesian Voivodeship